The Professor of Humanity is a Professorship at the University of Glasgow in Scotland. Under the Nova Erectio of James VI the teaching of Latin was in the responsibility of the Regents.  The title of Professor of Humanity was, on occasion, attached to one of the Regents' number from 1618.

A separate Chair was created in 1682.  After lapse it was revived in 1706.

Humanity Professors
 James Young MA (1682)
 Andrew Ross MA (1706)
 George Ross MA (1735)
 George Muirhead MA (1754)
 William Richardson MA (1773)
 Josiah Walker MA (1815)
 William Ramsay MA (1831-1863)
 George Gilbert Ramsay MA LLD DLitt (1863-1906)
 John Swinnerton Phillimore MA LLD LittD (1906-1927)
 William Rennie CBE MA LLD LittD (1927-1934)
 Christian James Fordyce MA LLD (1934-1971)
 Peter Gerald Walsh MA PhD DLitt FRSE (1971-1991)
 Roger Philip Hywell Green BA BLitt (1995-2008)

See also
Humanity

(Sources: Who, What and Where: The History and Constitution of the University of Glasgow.  Compiled by Michael Moss, Moira Rankin and Lesley Richmond)

Humanity
1682 establishments in Scotland